A constitutional referendum was held in Russia between 25 June and 1 July 2020. President Vladimir Putin proposed the referendum during his address to the Federal Assembly on 15 January 2020. The draft amendments to the constitution were submitted to a referendum in accordance with article 2 of the Law on Amendments to the Constitution. The referendum is legally referred to as an "All-Russian vote", for it is not held in accordance with the Federal Constitutional Law on the Referendum.

The amendments include sweeping changes to the constitution, including allowing Putin to run again for two more six-year presidential terms and enshrining social measures on pensions and welfare state as well as conservative ones such as constitutionally banning same-sex marriage, ensuring patriotic education in schools, and placing the constitution above international law.

Originally scheduled for 22 April 2020, the vote was postponed to a later date due to the COVID-19 pandemic in Russia. It had been noted that the initial vote date coincided with the 150th anniversary of Vladimir Lenin's birth. In-person voting at the polling stations was held from 25 June to 1 July, with 1 July being declared a day off as the actual voting date. Residents of Moscow and the Nizhny Novgorod Oblast could participate in the event remotely (electronically) from 25 to 30 June.

According to official results, 79% of valid votes supported the changes to the constitution. Later that year, Putin accepted the results and signed them into law. Many international observers criticized the results of the referendum claiming widespread reports of irregularities such as: including voter coercion, multiple voting, violation of secrecy of the vote and allegations of police violence against a journalist who was present to observe. Further criticism is centered around the amendment that could extend Putin's presidency to 2036.

Proposed amendments 

On 19 December 2019, Vladimir Putin announced possible amendments to the Constitution during a press conference. The following month, he repeated his intention to amend the constitution when he addressed the Federal Assembly.

Among notable changes were the right of the president to remove federal justices, to remove Supreme Justices following approval by the Federation Council, a right for the lower house of the Parliament to appoint the prime minister and the "supremacy of Russian law over international law". It also extended presidential term limits, enabling Putin, if reelected, to hold presidential office until 2036. The previous version of the constitution would have required him to step down in 2024; this move has been labelled a "power grab" by some commentators. The extension to term limits allows Putin (and former President Medvedev) to run for two further six-year presidential terms, something Putin has not yet ruled out. Critics have accused him of plotting to stay in power for life, while supporters have lauded the inclusion of the amendment.

Putin ordered the creation of a working group of 75 people to work on drafting proposed amendments.

The amendments stipulate social guarantees for citizens. The amendments mention, for the first time in the constitution: marriage – defined as the union of a man and a woman, faith in God, as well as the State Council (which increases its role). The Russian nationality will be called a state-forming one. The institution of the presidency will be strengthened. The word "consecutive" will be removed from the clause which limits the term of ruling the country to "two consecutive terms".  The amendments also stipulate the right of the Constitutional Court to block the implementation of decisions of international organizations on the grounds of the unconstitutionality of such decisions (the body has had this power since 2015).

List
On 20 January 2020, President Vladimir Putin submitted the draft amendments to the State Duma, expecting 14 articles to be changed in total:

the Russian constitution will supersede international law;
the State Duma will have the right to approve a Prime Minister's candidacy (currently it only gives consent to the appointment), and it will also be able to approve candidates for Deputy Prime Minister and Federal Minister; the President will not be able to refuse their appointment, but in some cases will be able to remove them from office;
the eligibility term requiring competing candidates for high-profile offices (President, Ministers, judges, heads of regions) to have no foreign citizenship or permit of residence in foreign countries, or have it at the time of their work in the office or, at any time before running for the President;
the minimal residency requirement for presidential candidates will be raised from 10 years to 25;
the Federation Council will be able to propose to the President to dismiss Federal judges; in some cases, the Federation Council, on the proposal of the President, will have the right to remove judges of the Constitutional and Supreme courts;
heads of law enforcement agencies must be appointed by the President in consultation with the Federation Council;
the minimum wage cannot be lower than the subsistence minimum;
regular indexation of pensions;
consolidation of the status and role of the State Council (at present it is only an advisory body and is not prescribed in the Constitution);
granting the Constitutional Court the ability to check the constitutionality of laws adopted by the Federal Assembly of the Russian Federation at the request of the President before they are signed by the President;
removal of the term "in a row" from the article regulating presidential term limits, discounting previous and current terms before the amendment entered into force;
defining marriage as a relationship between one man and one woman;
enshrine the status of the Russian language in the country's constitution.

Proposed adoption without a referendum
The Constitution of the Russian Federation was accepted on the national vote on 12 December 1993 and consists of nine chapters. The order of revision of Chapters 1, 2 and 9 is prescribed in Article 135 of the Constitution and requires the convening of the Constitutional Assembly for the adoption of the new Constitution. The procedure for amending Chapters 3 to 8 is defined in Article 136 and requires the adoption of the law on amendments to the Constitution of the Russian Federation according to a procedure similar to (but not identical due to the requirement of ratification of the amendment by regional legislative bodies) the adoption of a federal constitutional law.

Several amendments have been made to the Constitution since its enactment. The largest were the amendments proposed in the 2008 Presidential message. Other amendments included an amendment to merge the Supreme and Supreme Arbitration Courts, as well as the amendment to appoint an additional group of Federation Council members ("representatives of the Russian Federation") by the President. The Constitution was also amended in connection with the formation or liquidation of the Federation's constituent entities, as well as with their renaming.

Putin noted that Russia's parliament is legally capable of changing the Constitution, but he argued that a national vote is necessary to make the amendments legitimate. While Putin said the package of amendments should be put to a nationwide vote, Kremlin spokesman Dmitry Peskov said that the vote does not entail a referendum. On 20 January 2020, Putin submitted a bill on constitutional amendments to the State Duma (the lower house of parliament). The amendment of the Constitution proposed by Putin requires neither a referendum, nor convening of the Russian Constitutional Assembly.

Proposed consultative All-Russia voting

Terminology

The current Constitution of the Russian Federation was adopted by "nationwide voting" on 12 December 1993. This is an official term with legal meaning. Amendments or a new constitution can be also adopted by "nationwide voting".

Article 3 of the 1993 Constitution of Russia says:

Chapter 9 says:

Therefore, "referendum", "free elections" and "nationwide voting" are provisioned by the Constitution. A 50%+ turnout is mandatory for "nationwide voting" according to the Article 135 of the 1993 Constitution of Russia.

The Federal Constitutional Law on the Referendum was adopted in 1995. A period of campaign, 50%+ turnout and international democratic electoral standards are mandatory for a referendum. The results of a referendum are binding and can't be changed unless a new referendum is held. Russian law does not provide for consultative referendums.

Discussion
On the other hand, Putin's statement that a “final decision” will be made only after the voting process can be interpreted to mean that the vote itself will not be binding. According to the Constitution, however, that is not the case: The results of a nationwide vote must be enforced as is. This means that a referendum would be conducted as an extra constitutional procedure (much like an online poll). Critics have accused Putin of orchestrating a "constitutional coup" and seeking to fast-track changes to the country's political system without going through proper procedures including a referendum.

All-Russian voting
The renewal of the Constitution requires neither a referendum, nor convening of the Constitutional Assembly, but "All-Russian voting" is provisioned by Article 2 of the draft law on making amendments to the Russian Constitution. Putin introduced this term for the first time and it is not a legal term with clear definition. All-Russian voting is not provisioned by the constitution or mentioned in any federal laws, regional laws or any other legal documents.

Voting procedure 

In response to the COVID-19 pandemic, measures to prevent the spread of the disease were taken on the recommendation of the Federal Service for Surveillance on Consumer Rights Protection and Human Wellbeing (Rospotrebnadzor). These measures include extending the voting period to five days, screening for fever with a thermometer at the entrance to polling stations, providing polling station workers with personal protective equipment and encouraging social distancing.

Also, the Central Electoral Commission (CEC) meeting on 2 June came up with several voting options: outside the Precinct Electoral Committee (PEC) tied to the registration address through the Mobile Voter scheme; outside the polling station (in the adjacent territories), as well as contactless voting from home. Within the framework of this plebiscite, no valid reason is needed for voting from home, and the PEC agrees with the voter on the preferred time. These voting options are available not only on 1 July, but also from 25 to 30 June. Application submission is open until 21 June, for this purpose one should submit an application (including one over the phone) to vote at the preferred location – to the Territorial Election Commission (TEC), PEC, Multifunctional Centre for Public Services (MFC) or through the State Services (Gosuslugi) portal. There are also safety measures for those who vote from home: commission members and observers will not enter apartment or houses. They will be wearing personal protective equipment and also they will have to provide a voter with a kit with a mask, gloves, a pen and a sanitizer.

Remote electronic voting (REV), which was made available in the regions of Moscow and Nizhny Novgorod, was  first tested in the Moscow City Duma elections in 2019. Application submission was made open until 2 pm. on 21 June. The voting went from the morning of 25 June until the end of the day on 30 June. The voters who have registered on the portals mos.ru and gosuslugi.ru after 5 June will not be able to take part in electronic voting in order to avoid "rigged" voting. Only those users who have successfully passed the check and matching against the data in the State Automates System "Elections" will be allowed to vote. Accounts with recently changed phone numbers will be blocked as well. A unified portal 2020og.ru and a special territorial commission have been created for remote electronic voting.

Special voting mode will be chosen at voting sites abroad. Each embassy and consulate will determine on its own if it is possible to arrange voting until 1 July.

Three categories of participants can observe and control the voting: members of the commission with the casting vote, observers and media representatives. The precinct commissions are formed in advance, observers can be sent to the all-Russian voting by the regional public chambers according to the applications submitted in advance, and the representatives of mass media must have an agreement with the editorial board concluded not later than two months before the voting appointment. It is stated that at the preliminary voting stage the CEC will publish daily data on the turnout, and the votes for and against will be counted only after the end of the voting on 1 July.

Campaign

Opposition movements, parties and politicians took a different attitude towards voting.

As there is no minimum voter turn-out, the amendments will be considered approved and enacted if the majority of the actual voters agree with the changes. However, in order to demonstrate strong management skills, local authorities and state-funded organizations are using traditional tactics to increase voter participation and encouraging people to vote online and ahead-of-schedule.

The law that regulates nationwide voting does not mention any political agitation. Government authority has the right to inform the public, and the election committee is obliged to do so.

The Opposition movement, various parties and politicians have different opinions regarding the voting: some are in its favor, some are against it (such as Open Russia and the Communist Party of the Russian Federation), some have chosen to boycott the referendum (such as the Left Front, Yabloko, and PARNAS). According to political analyst Alexander Pozhalov and founder of Yabloko Grigory Yavlinsky, voting on the amendments will essentially become a referendum on Putin's support, and according to Yavlinsky it opens the way to his lifelong rule. On 4 June, Communist Party leader Gennady Zyuganov called on his supporters to vote against the amendments. He said that "the new version of the Basic Law only strengthens the presidential dictatorship and consolidates oligarchic domination" in a statement. Furthermore, he said that the "July 1 vote is more of a ritual in nature. It does not have the status of a referendum, does not fit with the electoral law. All this once again exposes the falsity of bourgeois democracy." Zyuganov also said that the CEC organises the vote in "a legally dubious procedure" and that "there are unlimited possibilities for fraud." He said that a boycott of the vote would not do anything and that active participation is required.

A number of Russian celebrities were among the supporters of a 'yes' vote, who were sharing posts and video clips on social media. Those who have expressed their solidarity with the amendments over Instagram are mainly the ones who are promoting the online-voting. Among them are names such as Evgeni Plushenko and his wife Yana Rudkovskaya, TV hosts Olga Buzova and Kseniya Borodina, and singers Stas Mikhailov and Keti Topuria.

Various political and public figures have started the campaign “NET!” ("No!") against the constitutional amendments. Political activist Maksim Katz has been leading the campaign and strongly encouraging the voters to participate. The politician and founder of the Anti-Corruption Foundation, Alexei Navalny, called for a boycott of the referendum. Journalist Yury Dud voiced his opposition against the amendments, reminding the public that in 2008 the current president was against changing the Constitution as well.

On 28 February, the head of the Central Election Commission (CEC) of Russia Ella Pamfilova announced the abolition of the scientific and expert council at the commission, explaining this with its "absolutely unacceptable" form and "absolute anachronism". According to RBK, shortly before this, a number of board members wrote a letter criticizing the upcoming vote. Former board member and editor-in-chief of Ekho Moskvy radio station Alexei Venediktov publicly opposed expanding opportunities for early and home-based voting because of the inability to observe the process, which in his opinion could lead to a "discrediting of voting results", and linked the dissolution of the council with the negative attitude of its members towards the upcoming vote.

Opinion polls

The survey results show a large variation in turnout forecasts and the final decision on the amendments. The experts attribute the difference to several factors: the peculiarities of the questions' wording and the initial orientation towards different audiences. A part of the population expresses distrust in the polling data – a long-term trend towards a decrease in trust in the data of opinion polls. Nevertheless, the last poll of 15 June by state-run VTsIOM recorded that 83% of respondents knew the date of the all-Russian vote, 68% of respondents expressed their intention to vote, 17% did not plan to vote.

Exit poll

Results

By federal subject

The percentages below are calculated from the total of voters instead of the total of valid votes. The difference from 100% thus consist of blank and invalid votes.

Results in the Nenets Autonomous Okrug
The Nenets Autonomous Okrug was the only subject of the federation where the majority of citizens (55%) voted 'No'.

The main reason is believed to be due to the strong disagreement by the residents of the subject of the federation to unite with Arkhangelsk Oblast. The interim governor of the Nenets Autonomous Okrug, Yuri Bezdudny, said: "Yes, the majority of the inhabitants of the Nenets spoke out against the Russian vote. But their voices are not against amendments, it is a reaction on the topic with the unification of the Nenets Autonomous Okrug and the Arkhangelsk Oblast. Nearly half of the district's residents spoke in favor of the amendments. Their opinion also needs to be respected. Most importantly, the elections in the Nenets Autonomous Region were fair, transparent, without violations and in compliance with all sanitary standards."

Results in the Komi Republic
Late in the evening of July 1, after processing 5.2% of the protocols in the Komi Republic, 68.88% of the participants voted against amendments to the Constitution, 29.93% voted in favor. However, after a few minutes, the results were reversed. The Central Election Commission specified that after processing 28.31% of the protocols 66.19% of the voters supported the constitutional amendments in the republic, 32.89% were against. CEC Chairman Ella Pamfilova explained that the cause of the error was the tiredness of the election commission members: “Well, elementary, as I was told, people were tired. The line has slipped - and that’s it, sorry”.

Grigory Kablis, the former chairman of the party of the Progress Party in the Komi Republic, explained to the publication Seven by Seven that since the data of the final protocols are not entered manually, but using QR codes through the GAS Vybory system (starting in 2017 in the Komi Republic), then the operator error during data entry was excluded. Kablis suggested that after receiving at 21:00 automatically the preliminary results, which he called "very different from the average for Russia", at about 21:05 all territorial election commissions in the Komi Republic were forbidden to enter data in the GAS Vybory. Those polling stations that showed negative results were ordered to recount ballots. In general, Kablis concluded that “there was no trust in the electoral system of Russia in general and the Komi Republic in particular,” he said.

Reactions 
A number of foreign leaders congratulated President Putin by phone, including President of Azerbaijan Ilham Aliyev, Prime Minister of India Narendra Modi, President of Kazakhstan Kassym-Jomart Tokayev,  President of Tajikistan Emomali Rahmon and President of Uzbekistan Shavkat Mirziyoyev.

The United States said that it was "troubled by reports of Russian government efforts to manipulate the result of the recent votes on constitutional amendments." The European External Action Service said that it "expect[s] all reports and allegations of irregularities, including voter coercion, multiple voting, violation of secrecy of the vote and allegations of police violence against a journalist who was present to observe, to be duly investigated."

On 19 November 2021, two members of the United States Congress introduced a resolution to end the country's recognition of Vladimir Putin as president of Russia if he remains in power after 2024. The Kremlin denounced it as an attempt to meddle in its domestic affairs.

Accusations of fraud and coercion

Forbes and The Moscow Times discussed allegations of fraud presented by physicist Sergei Shpilkin, who alleged that 22 million votes could be fraudulent, and alleged similar tactics to those used in both the 2011 legislative election and 2018 presidential election, for which he previously published statistical evidence alleging fraud.

The Associated Press reported that prizes were offered as encouragement to vote, that voters with Russian passports from eastern Ukraine were bused across the border to vote, that during early voting several ballot boxes were unattended at night, and that in Moscow, some journalists and activists said they were able to cast their ballots both online and in person in a bid to show the lack of safeguards against manipulations.

Golos, an independent Russian election watchdog, claimed that the electoral process was "rigged from the start" and "unfairly skewed by a noisy one-sided propaganda campaign."

The New York Times reported that employees at state-funded libraries in St. Petersburg complained that they had been ordered by their institutions to vote and on which day. The newspaper also suggested that "a long propaganda campaign preceded the referendum", and that public discourse focused mainly on the patriotic elements of the bill, such as remembering the war dead of World War II, enshrining the Russian language, and pension protection. The controversial elements, such as the zeroing of Putin's previous terms and a weakening of judicial independence, saw almost no mention in official messaging or public discourse.

References

External links
 How Russia’s constitutional reforms went from nonexistent to fully drafted in only five days—Meduza
 The transfer of power begins: A step-by-step guide to Vladimir Putin's address on the future of the Russian government—Meduza
 Putin wants to give Russian law priority over international law without an entirely new constitution. Technically, that's not legally possible.—Meduza

Constitutional referendum
2020 referendums
2020 constitutional referendum
Anti-LGBT sentiment
June 2020 events in Russia
July 2020 events in Russia
2020 constitutional referendum
Opposition to same-sex marriage
2020 constitutional
Referendums postponed due to the COVID-19 pandemic
Vladimir Putin